Come Feel Me Tremble is Paul Westerberg's fifth solo album. Like its predecessor, it is a rough collection of songs that Westerberg recorded by himself in his home.

Recording
Come Feel Me Tremble is a rough collection of songs that Westerberg recorded by himself in his home. The song "Crackle & Drag", which was recorded in both its louder original take and quieter alternate version, is about the poet Sylvia Plath. It takes its title from the last line of her poem "Edge." Westerberg was struck by the calm and considered preparations Plath took before committing suicide. "What a Day (For a Night)" was written for Bonnie Raitt, who didn't want it, while "Pine Box" is about Westerberg's father's experience of World War II and its lasting impact.

Critical reception

Come Feel Me Tremble received generally positive reviews from critics.

Track listing
The track listing on the album is incorrect. "Hillbilly Junk" is listed as being the third song when, in reality, it is the ninth. All songs were written by Paul Westerberg unless noted otherwise.
 "Dirty Diesel" – 3:13
 "Making Me Go" – 2:54
 "Soldier of Misfortune" – 3:05
 "My Daydream" – 3:17
 "What a Day (For a Night)" – 3:13
 "Wild & Lethal" – 5:20
 "Crackle & Drag (Original Take)" – 3:49
 "Crackle & Drag (Alternate Version)" – 2:35
 "Hillbilly Junk" – 2:50
 "Never Felt Like This Before" – 1:02
 "Knockin' Em Back" – 4:00
 "Pine Box" – 6:01
 "Meet Me Down the Alley" – 5:05
 "These Days" (Jackson Browne) – 4:06

References

External links
 

2003 albums
Paul Westerberg albums
Vagrant Records albums
Albums produced by Paul Westerberg